Magical Acres is a Standardbred Training Facility located in Chesterfield Township, New Jersey. It is owned and operated by Chuck Sylvester, hall of fame trainer and the only trainer to win the Hambletonian Stakes four times. It was established in the late 1990s and continues to be family run by Sylvester and his family. The farm boasts 14 barns, 12 which contain fifteen stalls, two wash stalls, a feed room, laundry room, kitchen, and lounge. There is one 80 stall barn that belongs to the owner and another barn which is for their onsite farrier. There is also a state of the art therapy pool and two training tracks, one which is the fastest fast track in the state.

Chuck Sylvester 
Since the 1980s, Chuck Sylvester has been one of the most successful trainers in harness racing.  Born in Toledo, Ohio on June 18, 1940, and after modest success at the Ohio raceways and fairs, Chuck earned enormous success and notoriety with one of the sport greatest trotters ever—Mack Lobell.

Mack Lobell was the 1987 and 1988 Horse of the Year—only the third trotter in harness racing history to repeat two years in a row.  This great trotter set world records on every sized oval, winning every major trotting stake possible.  "Mack" went on to score a 41-5-6 record from 58 starts during his three years of racing, taking a sophomore record of 1:52.1 at Springfield and earning $3.9 million.

He was twice named Trotter of the Year (in 1993 & 1994), and won, among others, the Breeders Crown at two and three, the Beacon Course, an American National, etc.  Chuck began his career by campaigning at Raceway Park and at the Detroit area tracks.  In the late 1960s he developed the Invitational trotters Slomen and Sirloin, but garnered additional success with Diamond Exchange—a son of Arnie Almahurst that Chuck bought for $6,000 as a yearling who went on to earn over $624,000 with a mark of 1:55.

Chuck is a hall of fame trainer and has earned over $20 million in his career. He had three children, his eldest son died in a vehicle accident at Magical Acres in August 2010. He also has five grand children. His daughter continues to run the business along with his son in law who is also a top trainer for harness racing, training many $450k claiming horses.

References 

Buildings and structures in Burlington County, New Jersey